Upper Snyder Lake is located in Glacier National Park, in the U. S. state of Montana. Upper Snyder Lake is NNE of Snyder Lake.

See also
List of lakes in Flathead County, Montana (M-Z)

References

Lakes of Glacier National Park (U.S.)
Lakes of Flathead County, Montana